Erik Magnuson (born January 5, 1994) is a retired American football center. He played college football at Michigan.

College career
Magnuson played in 46 games for Michigan. In 2016, he started all 12 games at right tackle, earning All-Big Ten first-team award.

Professional career

San Francisco 49ers
After going undrafted in the 2017 NFL Draft, Magnuson signed with the San Francisco 49ers as an undrafted free agent on May 4, 2017. He played in four games, starting two at both tackle spots, before being placed on injured reserve on November 29, 2017.

On July 25, 2019, Magnuson was waived/injured by the 49ers and placed on injured reserve. He was released on August 2, 2019.

Buffalo Bills
On August 20, 2019, Magnuson signed with the Buffalo Bills. He was released during final roster cuts on August 31, 2019 and was signed to the practice squad the next day.

Oakland / Las Vegas Raiders
On October 30, 2019, Magnuson was signed by the Oakland Raiders off the Bills practice squad. He was waived on November 27, 2019 and re-signed to the practice squad. On December 30, 2019, Magnuson was signed to a reserve/future contract. He was waived on August 3, 2020. He was signed to the practice squad on September 6, 2020. Magnuson was fined  by the NFL on October 5, 2020, for attending a charity event hosted by teammate Darren Waller during the COVID-19 pandemic in violation of the NFL's COVID-19 protocols for the 2020 season; these fines were later dropped. He was elevated to the active roster on January 2, 2021, for the team's week 17 game against the Denver Broncos, and reverted to the practice squad after the game. He signed a reserve/future contract on January 5, 2021. He retired from the Las Vegas Raiders on June 3, 2021.

References

External links
Michigan bio

1994 births
Living people
Sportspeople from Carlsbad, California
Players of American football from California
American football offensive tackles
Michigan Wolverines football players
San Francisco 49ers players
Buffalo Bills players
Las Vegas Raiders players
Oakland Raiders players